= ProGlycProt =

Content
- Description: prokaryotic glycoproteins.

Contact
- Authors: Aadil H Bhat
- Primary citation: Bhat & al. (2012)
- Release date: 2011

Access
- Website: http://www.proglycprot.org/

ProGlycProt is a database of experimentally verified glycosites and glycoproteins of the prokaryotes.
